Knud Ørn Bryn (15 March 1855 – 28 May 1941) was a Norwegian engineer and industrialist. He was one of the pioneers in the development of modern hydropower plants in Norway.

Biography 
Bryn was born in Trondheim, Norway. He was the son of Thomas Bryn (1813-1902) and Kristine Emilie Caroline Richter (1825-1869). He  was the brother of anthropologist Halfdan Bryn and engineer Alfred Bryn. Bryn graduated from the Trondheim Technical School (Trondhjems Tekniske Læreanstalt) in 1874 and completed engineering exam at the Technical University of Munich in  1877. He worked first as an engineer at various railway. In 1883, he established the Trondheim Electric Bureau. In 1884, Bryn moved Christiania (now Oslo). In 1886. he was appointed first director of Christiania Telephone Society.
In 1898, he established Hafslund ASA the company which operated the power grid supplying electricity to Oslo.  He served as manager of Hafslund until 1928.  Bryn was chairman from 1929 to 1936 of AS Tyssefaldene, a power company supplying power to energy-intensive industrial companies in
Odda, the main commercial and economic centre of the region of  Hardanger.

Bryn was a member of the Norwegian Academy of Science and Letters and of the Royal Swedish Academy of Engineering Sciences. He was decorated Commander with Star of the Order of St. Olav in 1928.

References

1855 births
1941 deaths
People from Trondheim
Norwegian Institute of Technology alumni
Norwegian engineers
Norwegian business executives
Norwegian company founders
Norwegian industrialists
Recipients of the St. Olav's Medal